Gail Christian is an Antiguan and Barbudan politician and senator. She is a senator of the Upper House of Parliament in Antigua and Barbuda. She was appointed senator by Prime Minister Gaston Browne.

Early life and education 
Gail Christian attended the Antigua Girls' High School, where she received her secondary school diploma. After her diploma, she attended Antigua State College where she received her certificates in History, Law, Politics and General Studies. After her graduation from Antigua State College, she enrolled into the University of Wolverhampton in the United Kingdom, where she obtained an LLB Degree (Honors) in 1997. Christian later took the English Bar Course at BPP Law School and obtained the Council of Legal Education Certificate from the University of Oregon School of Law.

Career 
In 1998, after her education Christian returned to Antigua and Barbuda where she served as an apprentice with Lake and Kentish, an Antigua-based law firm.

In 1999, she joined the Ministry of Justice and Legal Affairs, Antigua as a public prosecutor. She was attached as Prosecutor to the Office of the Director of Public Prosecutions and to the Royal Police Force of Antigua and Barbuda. In 2009, Christian contested the St. John’s Rural West seat under the Antigua Labour Party but was unsuccessful.

After an unsuccessful run at the elections, in 2009 she was appointed member of the Upper House of Parliament in Antigua and Barbuda (senate) by Prime Minister Baldwin Spencer . She served as the senate minority leader while in the senate. In 2013, she resigned as senator. In 2014, Christian was appointed as Antigua and Barbuda's Ambassador to Mexico by prime minister Gaston Browne.

In 2018, Christian was appointed for a second time senator in the Upper House of Parliament in Antigua and Barbuda.

References

See also 

 Senate (Antigua and Barbuda)

Living people
21st-century women politicians
Antigua and Barbuda Labour Party politicians
Antigua and Barbuda politicians
Members of the Senate (Antigua and Barbuda)
Year of birth missing (living people)